T. K. Abdullah (1929 – 15 October 2021) was an Islamic scholar, senior leader and member of Central Advisory Council of Jamaat-e-Islami Hind. He was a founding member of the All India Muslim Personal Law Board.

Early life and education
T. K. Abdullah was born in 1929 at Ayancheri, a village in Kozhikode District. He completed his education from various Islamic institutes. While he was studying at Aliya college, Kasargode, he joined the Prabodhanam journal in 1950.

He died on 15 October 2021, at the age of 94 in his home town Kuttiyadi, Kerala.

Career

Editor
After joining Prabodhanam in 1950, he became deputy chief editor in 1959. In 1964, while Prabodhanam started weekly, Abdullah was the first chief editor until 1995. Later he joined Bodhanam Quarterly journal as its chief editor.

Literary works
He contributed to translating two volumes of Tafhim-ul-Quran to Malayalam. He was chief editor of "Islamic Encyclopedia Project" being published by Islamic Publishing House.  He wrote some books such as Nadannu theeratha vazhikalil, Navothana dharmangal, Nazhikakallukal, Iqbaline kandethal etc.

Jamaat-e-Islami Leader
After getting membership in Jamaat-e-Islami Hind in 1959, he reached the top position in Kerala Jamat (President-Amir) from 1972 to 1979 and from 1982 to 1984 periods. During his leadership, Jamaat-e-Islami Kerala faced the Emergency of 1975. Many of its leaders were jailed during the emergency, including T. K. Abdullah. He was a member of Markazi Majlis-e-Shoora of Jamaat-e-Islami Hind from 1972 until his death.

References 

1929 births
2021 deaths
20th-century Indian Muslims
Indians imprisoned during the Emergency (India)
People from Kozhikode